James Albert Ettinger (April 18, 1919 – April 23, 2013) was a Canadian politician. He represented the electoral district of Hants East in the Nova Scotia House of Assembly from 1962 to 1970. He was a member of the Nova Scotia Progressive Conservative Party.

Ettinger was born in Shubenacadie, Nova Scotia. He was a funeral director. In 1964, he married Florence Archibald.

References

1919 births
2013 deaths
Progressive Conservative Association of Nova Scotia MLAs
People from Hants County, Nova Scotia
Canadian funeral directors